Turlina is a monotypic moth genus in the subfamily Lymantriinae. Its only species, Turlina punctata, is found on Madagascar. Both the genus and the species were first described by Paul Griveaud in 1976.

References

Lymantriinae
Monotypic moth genera